Seacrow Islet is a small island with an area of , in south-eastern Australia.  It is part of Tasmania’s  Trefoil Island Group, lying close to Cape Grim, Tasmania's most north-westerly point, in Bass Strait.

Fauna
Breeding seabird and shorebird species include little penguin, short-tailed shearwater, fairy prion, Pacific gull and sooty oystercatcher. The Cape Barren goose has been recorded breeding.

References

Islands of Tasmania